A special election for Cebu's 5th district seat in the House of Representatives of the Philippines was held on May 30, 2005.

Background
In 2004, representative Joseph Ace Durano (Lakas-CMD) was appointed by President Gloria Macapagal Arroyo as Secretary of Tourism. Durano accepted the appointment on November 30, 2004, which caused his seat to be vacated. As a result, the House of Representatives issued a resolution on March 2, 2005, declaring the seat vacant, paving way for the Commission on Elections to call an election on May 30, 2005. Candidates filed their certificates of candidacy from April 22 to 28. Campaign period was from April 29 to May 28.

Campaign 
Three candidates ran in the election:

 Dean Severo Dosado, former vice mayor of Sogod
 Ramon Durano VI, brother of outgoing congressman Ace Durano
 Wilfredo Tuadles, businessman

President Gloria Macapagal Arroyo declared a special non-working holiday in the 5th district on election day so that voters can participate in the election.

Result

Durano's brother, Ramon Durano VI of the Nationalist People's Coalition (NPC), won convincingly to keep the seat within the Durano family, winning in all 891 polling precincts in the district's ten towns and Danao. His grandfather, Ramon Durano, Sr., previously held the seat from 1949 to 1971 (the area was districted as Cebu's 1st district at that time). Ramon VI's father, Ramon Durano III, then mayor of Danao, later became congressman and then represented the district for three consecutive terms from 1987 to 1998, before Joseph Ace succeeded him. Joseph Ace was on his second term when he was appointed Tourism secretary. Even before the votes were cast, Durano's opponent, Dean Severo Dosado, was quoted as having said he did not think he was going to win. He and the other candidate, Wilfredo Tuadles, did not field any poll watchers.

The low turnout (48.56%) was blamed on the non-inclusion of areas outside the district in the special holiday for the election. Another factor was the nonexistence of campaign materials from the candidates. The turnout in Liloan, the town with the lowest turnout at 31.78%, was blamed on the town fiesta that prevented the electorate from voting.

Dosado described the election as a "waste of money" and blamed Joseph Ace for it.

References

External links
COMELEC Resolution 7468

2005 in the Philippines
2005 elections in the Philippines
Special elections to the Congress of the Philippines
Elections in Cebu